A Jongmyo (宗庙)  or Taimiao (太庙) is an ancient Chinese ancestral temple dedicated to the ancestors of nobles and monarchs and their spirit tablets. Jong (宗) means ancestral and Myo (庙) means temple. The earliest known Jongmyo was discovered at Yinxu Palace and Temple Site in Anyang, Henan Province, China, and is yet to be excavated. At that time, commoners did not have the right to set up ancestral shrines, "The Xunzi-Liturgy" reads: "Therefore, those who have the world serve seven generations, those who have a country serve five generations, those who have five times the land serve three generations, those who have three times the land serve two generations, those who hold their hands and eat are not allowed to set up a temple, so the thick accumulation of the flow of water is wide, and the thin accumulation of water is narrow. "

In ancient China, the temple was regarded as a symbol of the country and was often referred to together with "Soil and grain," and destruction of the temple was often heavily punished. For example, the Tang Code treats the destruction of a temple as a crime of "treason".

Etymology 
The Korean word Jongmyo or Chinese Zongmiao is derived from two characters 宗 Zong meaning ancestors and 庙 Miao meaning temple. 

Taimiao is a related term with 太 Tai replacing 宗 Zong. Tai means highest.

China

Yinxu Palace and Temple Site 
The Yinxu Palace and Temple Site is an imperial temple of the Yin Shang emperor near Jingji in China, Shang dynasty, about 3,300 years ago, excavated in Henan Province in Anyang City, today. Xijiao Township in the northwestern suburbs, near the capital of the Shang dynasty in China after . A large number of documents and implements from the same period of the Shang dynasty have been found at this temple site, such as the Simu Xin Ding. The Yinxu Market was selected as a World Heritage Site in 2006.

Taimiao, Beijing 

 is located on the east side of Beijing's Tiananmen, and was the patriarchal temple of theChinese emperors of the Ming and Qing dynasties. it was established as a peace park in 1924 and renamed on May 1, 1950, as Beijing Working People's Cultural Palace. The Beijing Imperial Temple has been listed as a People's Republic of China National Key Cultural Relics Protection Unit.

Temple of the Emperors 
The Temple of the Emperors and Emperors is a place of worship for the Three Sovereigns and Five Emperors and the emperors of China during the Ming dynasty and Qing dynasty, originally established in Yingtian Prefecture (now Nanjing), and moved to Shuntian Prefecture during the Jiajing period. Shuntian Prefecture (now Beijing), and is now located in Fuchengmennei Street, Xicheng District, Beijing.

Korea 

The Jongmyo system was first introduced from China in the Korean Peninsula by Silla. The Jongmyo in Korea was built in 1394 by the order of Taejo of Joseon and is the oldest royal Confucian temple in the world. Jongmyo was added to the World Heritage List by UNESCO in 1995. The Jongmyo ritual, a Confucian ritual dedicated to the Joseon Dynasty monarch and princess, is held every year on the first Sunday in May at Jongmyo in Seoul, Korea. The music of Jongmyo jerye is a kind of Korean court music and is called Jongmyo ritual music. Jongmyo jerye and Jongmyo jerye music were inscribed on the UNESCO Intangible Cultural Heritage Lists in 2001.

Japan 
The Ise Grand Shrine and Iwashimizu Hachimangū are collectively known as the "Nisho no Sōtō". The imperial shrine in the Three Palace Sanctuaries of the Tokyo Imperial Palace houses the tablets of the Ten Emperors, and is the current place of worship for the Japanese imperial family.

In the Edo period, Nikkō Tōshō-gū and other  are the temples of the Tokugawa Shogunate, and the Shogunate shoguns regularly visited them for worship. There is also a place for the Shogun's family to pay homage to their ancestors in the Gobudo-no-mikoto in Edo Castle, Ōkoku.

Ryukyu 

During the Ryukyu Second Shō dynasty, the Enkaku-ji Temple was the temple dedicated to the previous king. Tenno-ji Temple and Tenkai-ji Temple are dedicated to the posthumous monarchs, and Ryufu-ji Temple is dedicated to the tablets of the kings of the First Shō dynasty.

Vietnam 

Thế Miếu (Chữ Hán: 世廟), also called Thế Tổ Miếu (Chữ Hán: 世祖廟), is an ancestral temple to Vietnam's emperors in the Imperial City, Huế.

See also 

 Jongmyo rites
 Ancestral shrine
 Ci Shrine
 Jesa

References 

Jongmyo shrines
Miao shrines
Religious Confucianism